Artur Tahir oghlu Rasizade (born 26 February 1935) is an Azerbaijani politician who served as the Prime Minister of Azerbaijan from 1996 until 2003, and again from 2003 until 2018. Rasizade was a long-time Communist Party member during the Azerbaijan SSR period.

Biography

Artur Rasizade was born on 26 February 1935 in Kirovabad (now Ganja) in a teacher's family. His father Tair Mamed Oglou Rasizade was killed during World War II in 1942. In 1952, Artur Rasizade graduated from the Secondary school № 4 (Lankaran), and in 1957 he finished his studies at Azerbaijan State Oil and Industry University. After his graduation, he started working as engineer in Azerbaijani institute of oil mechanical engineering. In 1973, Rasizade became a scientific vice-principal of this institute.

In 1975, he was appointed as senior principal engineer of the State Oil Company of the Azerbaijan Republic (SOCAR). In 1977, he became a director of the Azerbaijani institute of oil mechanical engineering. From 1978 to 1981, he worked as vice-chairman of the State Planning Committee of the Azerbaijan SSR. From 1981 to 1986, he was a chief of the Department of Mechanical Engineering of the Azerbaijan Central Committee. From 1986 to 1992, he was the first vice-chairman of the Council of Ministers of the Azerbaijan SSR, supervising energy, mechanical engineering, defense, oil and chemical industries. From 1992 to 1996, he was a council of the Economic Development Fund.

From February 1996 he worked as an assistant of the President of Azerbaijan, Heydar Aliyev; then, on 3 May 1996, he was appointed as the First Deputy Prime Minister of Azerbaijan. On 20 July 1996, he became Acting Prime Minister of Azerbaijan, and on 26 November 1996 he was appointed as Prime Minister. On 4 August 2003, he was relieved of his post to make way for Aliyev's son Ilham and was instead appointed as First Deputy Prime Minister. However, on 4 November 2003 he resumed his post of Prime Minister after Ilham took office as President. He served for 15 years as Prime Minister before he was replaced in April 2018 by Novruz Mammadov.

Artur Rasizade is married and has a daughter.

Career 
He was officially Prime Minister from 26 November 1996 until 18 October 1998 and from 24 October 1998 until 4 August 2003, when he resigned, ostensibly due to health reasons, enabling President Heydar Aliyev's son Ilham Aliyev to assume the office for less than three months. Rasizade continued to act as Prime Minister for Ilham Aliyev, however, and he formally returned to the post on 4 November 2003, after Ilham Aliyev was elected as President of Azerbaijan. He was succeeded in the position by Novruz Mammadov on 21 April 2018. As First Deputy Prime Minister, Rasizade had been Acting Prime Minister from 20 July 1996 until formally assuming the post on 26 November of that year. Furthermore, as Acting First Deputy Prime Minister Rasizade held the same role from 31 October 2003, when Ilham Aliyev vacated the post to take up the presidency, until Aliyev had him formally re-appointed to the post on 4 November 2003. Finally, Rasizade had been Acting Prime Minister for 6 days in October 1998, between his own two formal terms of office.

Will a total tenure in office of 21 years and 187 days, Rasizade is by far Azerbaijan's longest-serving Prime Minister.

Awards
On 28 June 2006, Rasizade was awarded with Istiglal Order for his contributions to economic development of Azerbaijan by President Ilham Aliyev .

On 25 February 2015, Rasizade was given Shohrat Order for his special contributions to economic, scientific, social and cultural development.

Among others, Rasizade was awarded with Sharaf Order – Order of Glory; Order of National Cohesion; National Order of the Legion of Honour. 

In 1971, he was a winner of the USSR State Prize.

He was awarded "Order for service to the Fatherland" 1st Class on February 27, 2020.

References 

|-

1935 births
Living people
Azerbaijan Communist Party (1920) politicians
Azerbaijani mechanical engineers
Azerbaijani Shia Muslims
New Azerbaijan Party politicians
Politicians from Ganja, Azerbaijan
Prime Ministers of Azerbaijan
Recipients of the Istiglal Order